Time, The Healer is a 10 track debut album by None the Less which is due to be released in March 2010. The album was recorded at Glasseye Studios in Hatfield and was engineered by Dan Lancaster.

Track listing 
 "Concrete Souls"
 "Disconnected"
 "Bitter Taste"
 "Hurricanes"
 "Out Of Reach"
 "This Is The End"
 "The Jury"
 "Turn The Lights Off"
 "Last Goodbye"
 "Drive Away"

Personnel
 Anthony Giannacini — Vocals
 Owen Harvey – Guitar, Screams and Backing Vocals
 Joe Page — Guitar, Backing Vocals
 Oli Stanton — Bass
 Mike Smith – Drums

Singles 

Self-released albums
None the Less albums
2010 debut albums